is a Japanese football player who plays for Montedio Yamagata.

Career statistics
Updated to 26 July 2022.

References

External links
Profile at Montedio Yamagata

1989 births
Living people
Association football people from Tokyo
Japanese footballers
J1 League players
J2 League players
Montedio Yamagata players
Association football defenders